Austin Leslie Farnen (17 September 1919 – January 1985) was an English professional footballer. After serving in the military during the Second World War, Farnen joined Football League Third Division South side Watford in April 1946. He played at centre half for every competitive fixture of the 1946–47 season, but then made 27 appearances in his second season, and was released after only eight appearances for Watford in 1948–49. Farnen went on to join Bradford City, making eight further appearances in the Football League. He then joined Gloucester City in the Southern Football League making 25 appearances.

He died in Harrow in January 1985, aged 65.

References

1919 births
1985 deaths
Association football central defenders
Bradford City A.F.C. players
British military personnel of World War II
English Football League players
English footballers
Footballers from St Helens, Merseyside
Gloucester City A.F.C. players
Kingsbury Town F.C. players
Watford F.C. players